Hästhagen is a locality situated in Nacka Municipality, Stockholm County, Sweden with 499 inhabitants in 2010.

References 

Populated places in Nacka Municipality